Papia Sarwar (née Rahman, born on 21 November) is a Bangladeshi singer. She is an exponent of Rabindra Sangeet, the songs written and composed by Rabindranath Tagore. She earned Rabindra Award from Bangla Academy in 2013, Bangla Academy Fellowship in 2015 and Ekushey Padak in 2021.

Early life and education
Sarwar was born in Dhaka. She took music lessons from Atiqul Islam, Waheedul Haq, Sanjida Khatun and Zahidur Rahim at Chhayanaut in 1966 and later at Bulbul Academy of Fine Arts. She was a student of the Department of Zoology at the University of Dhaka. In 1973, she received a scholarship from the Government of India to study Rabindra Sangeet at Visva-Bharati University in Santiniketan. In Visva-Bharati University, she was trained in classical music under Dhrubotara Joshi and in Rabindra Sangeet under Santidev Ghosh, Subinoy Roy, Kanika Banerjee and Nilima Sen.

Career
Sarwar established a musical troupe named "Geetoshudha" in 1996.

Works
Albums
 Purna Chander Mayay (2013)
 Chokher Dekha Praner Katha (2014)

Personal life
The fifth of eight children of Sayed Bazlur Rahman and Fatema Rahman, she has been married to Sarwar A Alam since 1978. Together they have two daughters: Zaara Sarwar, Assistant  Professor of Biology in The College of New Jersey, and Jisha Sarwar, a public executive at the Canadian Ministry of Finance.

References

Living people
People from Barisal
Visva-Bharati University alumni
21st-century Bangladeshi women singers
21st-century Bangladeshi singers
Rabindra Sangeet exponents
Honorary Fellows of Bangla Academy
20th-century Bangladeshi women singers
20th-century Bangladeshi singers
20th-century women composers
Recipients of the Ekushey Padak
Year of birth missing (living people)